The ASEAN PGA Tour was a men's developmental professional golf tour. It was formed in 2007 and was created to give more competitive opportunities to young and upcoming professionals in the Southeast Asia region.

The tour acted as a developmental tour to the now also defunct OneAsia Tour, giving cards to high finishers on the ASEAN PGA Tour Order of Merit each year.

In 2008, the tour signed a deal with Mercedes-Benz, being renamed as the Mercedes-Benz Tour. The deal lasted for three years and finished in 2010.

The tour eventually folded in 2016 after not releasing a schedule for 2017.

2016 season

Schedule
The following table lists official events during the 2016 season.

Order of Merit
The Order of Merit was based on prize money won during the season, calculated in U.S. dollars.

2015 season

Schedule
The following table lists official events during the 2015 season.

Order of Merit
The Order of Merit was based on prize money won during the season, calculated in U.S. dollars.

2014 season

Schedule
The following table lists official events during the 2014 season.

Order of Merit
The Order of Merit was titled as the Road to the Sabah Masters and was based on prize money won during the season, calculated in U.S. dollars. The top five players on the tour (not otherwise exempt) earned status to play on the 2015 OneAsia Tour.

2013 season

Schedule
The following table lists official events during the 2013 season.

Order of Merit
The Order of Merit was based on prize money won during the season, calculated in U.S. dollars. The top five players on the tour (not otherwise exempt) earned status to play on the 2014 OneAsia Tour.

2012 season

Schedule
The following table lists official events during the 2012 season.

Order of Merit
The Order of Merit was based on prize money won during the season, calculated in U.S. dollars. The top 10 players on the tour (not otherwise exempt) earned status to play on the 2013 OneAsia Tour.

2011 season

Schedule
The following table lists official events during the 2011 season.

Order of Merit
The Order of Merit was based on prize money won during the season, calculated in U.S. dollars. The top five players on the tour (not otherwise exempt) earned status to play on the 2012 OneAsia Tour.

2010 season

Schedule
The following table lists official events during the 2010 season.

Order of Merit
The Order of Merit was based on prize money won during the season, calculated in U.S. dollars. The leading player on the tour (not otherwise exempt) earned status to play on the 2011 OneAsia Tour.

2009 season

Schedule
The following table lists official events during the 2009 season.

Order of Merit
The Order of Merit was based on prize money won during the season, calculated in U.S. dollars.

2008 season

Schedule
The following table lists official events during the 2008 season.

Order of Merit
The Order of Merit was based on prize money won during the season, calculated in U.S. dollars.

2007 season

Schedule
The following table lists official events during the 2007 season.

Order of Merit winners

Notes

References

Professional golf tours
Golf in Asia